Théodore-Augustin Forcade (1816–1885) was a French Roman Catholic archbishop.

Early life
Théodore-Augustin Forcade was born on March 2, 1816, in Versailles near Paris.

Vocation

Forcade was ordained priest at the Paris Foreign Missions Society in 1839.

He served as the Apostolic Vicar of Japan from 1846 to 1852, as the Pro-Prefect Apostolic of Hong Kong from 1847, as the Bishop of Basse Terre from 1853 to 1860, and as the Bishop of Nevers from 1860 to 1873.

He served as the Archbishop of Aix-en-Provence from 1873 to 1885.

Death
He died on September 12, 1885, in Aix-en-Provence.

References

1816 births
1885 deaths
People from Versailles
People from Aix-en-Provence
French Roman Catholic missionaries
19th-century Roman Catholic archbishops in France
Roman Catholic bishops of Basse-Terre